Thomas Kenny was an English professional rugby league footballer who played in the 1930s and 1940s.

International honours
Tom Kenny won a cap for England while at Salford in 1939 against Wales.

References

External links

Broughton Rangers players
England national rugby league team players
English rugby league players
Place of birth missing
Place of death missing
Rugby league five-eighths
Salford Red Devils players
Year of birth missing
Year of death missing